The Johnstown Flood: The Incredible Story Behind One of the Most Devastating Disasters America Has Ever Known  is a 1968 book written by popular historian David McCullough about the Great Flood of 1889 which devastated the town of Johnstown, Pennsylvania. His first book, McCullough spent time speaking with individuals who lived through the flood on top of his other research in preparation for writing. Upon its publication The Johnstown Flood rekindled national interest in the flood and was the catalyst to McCullough's accomplished career. Following the success of his book, McCullough decided to devote his time entirely towards writing.

See also
 The Johnstown Flood (1989 film)

References

External links
Official Site at Simon & Schuster
The Johnstown Flood from WorldCat

1968 non-fiction books
History books about American Civil Engineering
Books by David McCullough
Simon & Schuster books
History of Johnstown, Pennsylvania